The Woman on Pier 13 is a 1949 American film noir drama directed by Robert Stevenson and starring Laraine Day, Robert Ryan, and John Agar. It previewed in Los Angeles and San Francisco in 1949 under the title I Married a Communist but, owing to poor polling among preview audiences, this was dropped prior to its 1950 release.

Plot
Brad Collins, a San Francisco shipping executive (real name Frank Johnson) has recently married Nan Lowry Collins after a brief courtship. Brad was once involved with a communist group in New York while working as a stevedore during the Depression. Shortly after returning home following their honeymoon, the couple meet Christine Norman, an old flame of Brad's. Nan immediately dislikes her.

Brad becomes the target of a Communist cell led by Vanning, who orders an alleged FBI informer drowned after a brief interrogation. After threatening to reveal Brad's responsibility for a murder as well as his communist past, Vanning orders the executive to sabotage the shipping industry in the San Francisco Bay by resisting union demands in a labor dispute. He claims it is impossible to leave the Communist Party. Norman, bitter over being rejected by Brad, is ordered to become closer to his brother-in-law, Don Lowry, and to indoctrinate him with their Communist world view. Norman falls in love with Lowry, despite Vanning saying that she is not meant to be so emotional.

Brad's friend and former boyfriend of Nan, union leader Jim Travers, cannot understand why Brad has become unreasonable to deal with. Travers is concerned about the possibility of the small number of communists in the union being able to take it over, and suspects Norman of being a communist, or at least a fellow traveler. He discusses this with Lowry, who is a new colleague. Lowry denies Norman's politics. She confesses when confronted, but after Lowry rejects her she shows him a photograph of herself with Brad and reveals his communist past. Vanning interrupts them. Angry with Norman for breaking orders, who was supposed to be in Seattle for another two days on her day job as a photographer, Vanning tries to lean on Lowry because he is now able to expose the influence the party has regained over Collins.

Lowry travels to the Collins' residence to inform them of what he has learned, but is run over by a car driven by the communist hit man J.T. Arnold who had observed the earlier killing with Brad. Nan, previously informed by Norman that her brother is in danger, tries to convince her husband that Lowry's killing was not an accident. He pretends to be unconvinced. Confronting Norman, Nan is told of her husband's past, and Norman falsely informs her that Bailey was probably responsible for Lowry's death. Preparing a suicide note, Norman is interrupted by Vanning. He thinks this is a good solution, but wishes to keep politics out of it, so destroys her confession of communist involvement.

Intent on revenge, Nan befriends Bailey at the fairground where he has legitimate employment and goes off with him. The hit man is saved when she is identified, and Nan is kidnapped and taken to the hidden local communist headquarters in Arnold's warehouse. Brad tracks his wife down to this location, and by threatening Arnold with a gun, is able to gain admittance. In a shootout, Bailey and Vanning are killed, and Brad fatally injured. In his last moments Nan says she still loves him.

Cast
 Laraine Day as Nan Lowry Collins
 Robert Ryan as Brad Collins, aka Frank Johnson
 John Agar as Don Lowry
 Thomas Gomez as Vanning
 Janis Carter as Christine Norman
 Richard Rober as Jim Travers
 William Talman as Bailey, younger henchman
 Iris Adrian as the club waitress (uncredited)

Production
The original story forming the basis of the film by Slavin and George was first optioned then rejected by Eagle-Lion. It was announced in early September 1948 as RKO's first production following Howard Hughes takeover of the studio.

Hughes reputedly offered the script to directors as a test for presumed communist leanings. Thirteen directors, according to Joseph Losey, turned down the film including himself. John Cromwell said it was the worst film script he had ever read, while Nicholas Ray departed shortly before production began. Production began in April 1949 under Robert Stevenson and lasted a month. Newsreel footage of J. Edgar Hoover was requested, but denied because the FBI was aware of rumors Hughes was using the script as a ruse. The agency feared "persons of communist sympathies" would seek to undermine the project's intentions. Robert Ryan, a liberal, was the only available contracted RKO actor and only agreed to be cast out of fear for his career. After the film had been completed, and ahead of planned retakes, Hughes insisted Ryan needed to be taught how to work with a gun, with screen tests of Ryan's progress being delivered to him personally.

After the disappointing previews, Hughes still insisted the title I Married a Communist was the most marketable aspect of the picture, though his staff insisted otherwise. After a search, Hughes finally selected The Woman on Pier 13 in January 1950.

Reception

Original release and box-office
When the film was released, the staff at Variety magazine wrote a tepid review, "As a straight action fare, I Married a Communist generates enough tension to satisfy the average customer. Despite its heavy sounding title, pic hews strictly to tried and true meller formula ... Pic is so wary of introducing any political gab that at one point when Commie trade union tactics are touched upon, the soundtrack is dropped." The film was a commercial failure at the box-office, and recorded a loss of $650,000.

Later commentary
The British critic Tom Milne in the Time Out Film Guide wrote: "The sterling cast can make no headway against cartoon characters, a fatuous script that defies belief, and an enveloping sense of hysteria. Nick Musuraca's noir-ish camerawork, mercifully, is stunning." In Dennis Schwartz's review, he questioned the film's veracity: "The story was filled with misinformation: it distorted the communist influence in the country and how big business and unions act. It attempted to make a propaganda film that reaffirms the American way of life and familial love, but at the expense of reality."

Identifying The Woman on Pier 13 as an "amalgam of propaganda and noir", Jeff Smith considered it paradoxical "to use film to build political consensus" by borrowing "devices and storytelling strategies from the bleakest and most pessimistic films Hollywood ever made".

References

External links
 
 
 
 
 The Woman on Pier 13 informational site and DVD review at DVD Beaver (includes images)

1949 films
1940s political drama films
American anti-communist propaganda films
American political drama films
Cold War films
American black-and-white films
1940s English-language films
Film noir
Films critical of communism
Films directed by Robert Stevenson
Films set in San Francisco
Films shot in Los Angeles
Films shot in San Francisco
RKO Pictures films
1949 drama films
1940s American films
Films scored by Leigh Harline